DUMBA is  a collective living space and anarchist, queer, all-ages community center and venue in Brooklyn, New York.

Dumba may also refer to:
 Sano Dumba, a Village Development Committee, Bhojpur District, eastern Nepal
 Thulo Dumba, a Village Development Committee, Bhojpur District, eastern Nepal
 Dumba (Malanje), a town and commune in Angola
 Palais Dumba in Vienna, built for Nikolaus von Dumba, part of the architectural heritage of Greeks in Austria

People with the surname
 Nikolaus Dumba (1830-1900)
 Konstantin Dumba (1856-1947), Austro-Hungarian ambassador to the US
 Mathew Dumba (1994-present), NHL defenceman of the Minnesota Wild